Hermes Ladies' Hockey Club was a women's field hockey club based at St. Andrew's College in Booterstown, Dún Laoghaire–Rathdown, Ireland. The club entered teams in the Women's Irish Hockey League, the Irish Senior Cup and the Irish Junior Cup. In 2016 Hermes merged with the women's team at Monkstown Hockey Club and subsequently played as Hermes-Monkstown. As Hermes-Monkstown, the club represented Ireland in the 2017 EuroHockey Club Champions Cup.

History

Old Wesley Hockey Club
Hermes Ladies' Hockey Club was a successor club of the Old Wesley Hockey Club, originally founded by former pupils of Wesley College. During the 1950s and early 1960s, Old Wesley played at Leinster intermediate level. Traditionally Old Wesley recruited players from Protestant schools. However, in order to make the move to senior status, the club decided to expand its membership to the wider community and change its name. In April 1966 Old Wesley was relaunched as Hermes Ladies' Hockey Club, taking  Old Wesley's place in the Leinster Senior Division.

Irish Senior Cup
Hermes won the Irish Senior Cup for the first time in 1997, defeating Muckross 2–1 in the final. They won a second Irish Senior Cup in 1999 defeating Pegasus 3–2 in the final. They were cup winners on two further occasions in 2005 and 2006.

Notes

All-Ireland Club Championship
Hermes won the All-Ireland Club Championship on four occasions, in 2003, 2004, 2006 and 2008. In 2008 with a team that included Anna O'Flanagan, Chloe Watkins and Nicola Evans, all still schoolgirls, Hermes won the title after defeating Loreto in the final.

Notes

Women's Irish Hockey League
In 2008–09 Hermes were founder members of the Women's Irish Hockey League. With a team that included Nicola Evans, Anna O'Flanagan, Gillian Pinder and Chloe Watkins, they finished the season as runners up, after losing 2–1 in a penalty shoot-out in the league final against Loreto. Hermes were runners up again in 2010–11, losing 4–1 in the final to Pegasus. In 2015–16, with a team that included Evans, O'Flanagan and Watkins, Hermes won the league title and the EY Champions Trophy. In 2016 Hermes merged with Monkstown and the ladies' team subsequently played as Hermes-Monkstown.

Notes

EY Champions Trophy

Notes

Irish Junior Cup
Hermes second team entered the Irish Junior Cup.

Notes

Hermes in Europe
Hermes represented Ireland in European competitions on six occasions. After winning the 1997 Irish Senior Cup they played in the European Cup Winners Cup A Division in Belgium. After winning the 1999 Irish Senior Cup, Hermes finished in third place at the 2000 European Cup Winners Cup A Division tournament in Cologne. In 2012, with a team that featured Mary Goode, Audrey O'Flynn and Gillian Pinder, Hermes won the Women's EuroHockey Club Champion's Challenge I, defeating Lille Metropole 3–1 in the final. After winning the 2016 EY Champions Trophy as Hermes, they played in the 2017 EuroHockey Club Champions Cup as Hermes-Monkstown.

Notable former players
 Ireland internationals
When the Ireland women's national field hockey team won the silver medal at the 2018 Women's Hockey World Cup, the squad included five former Hermes players – Deirdre Duke, Nicola Evans, Anna O'Flanagan, Gillian Pinder and Chloe Watkins.

Honours
Women's Irish Hockey League
Winners: 2015–16: 1
Runners Up: 2008–09, 2010–11, 2016–17 : 3 
EY Champions Trophy
Winners: 2016
Runners Up: 2017
All-Ireland Club Championship
Winners: 2003, 2004, 2006, 2008: 4
Irish Senior Cup
Winners: 1997, 1999, 2005, 2006: 4 
Runners Up: 1974, 2000, 2002, 2004, 2010–11, 2014–15 : 6
Leinster Senior Cup
Winners: 1973–74, 1977–78: 2
Irish Junior Cup
Winners: 1979, 2006, 2009: 3 
Runners Up: 2004: 1
Women's EuroHockey Club Champion's Challenge I
Winners: 2012

References

Women's Irish Hockey League teams
1966 establishments in Ireland
2016 disestablishments in Ireland
Field hockey clubs established in 1966
Field hockey clubs disestablished in 2016
Field hockey clubs in Dún Laoghaire–Rathdown
Monkstown Hockey Club
Defunct field hockey clubs in Ireland